The Hansen Experimental Physics Laboratory (HEPL) was founded in 1947 and is a facility at Stanford University, California, United States, aiming to promote interdisciplinary enterprises across different branches of science.

External links
Official webpage of HEPL

Stanford University places